Bayguzino (Bayğuja) is a rural locality (a village) in Bayguzinsky Selsoviet, Ishimbaysky District, Bashkortostan, Russia. The population was 504 as of 2010. There are 9 streets.

Geography 
Bayguzino is located 11 km southeast of Ishimbay (the district's administrative centre) by road. Kinzebulatovo is the nearest rural locality.

References 

Rural localities in Ishimbaysky District
Ufa Governorate